Ray Ho (born 13 February 2000) is a Taiwanese tennis player.

Ho has a career high ATP singles ranking of 715 achieved on 18 July 2022. He also has a career high ATP doubles ranking of 297 achieved on 05 December 2022.

Ho represents Chinese Taipei at the Davis Cup.

Challenger and World Tennis Tour Finals

Singles: 2 (0-2)

References

External links

2000 births
Living people
Taiwanese male tennis players
21st-century Taiwanese people